The history of emotions is a field of historical research concerned with human emotion, especially variations among cultures and historical periods in the experience and expression of emotions. Beginning in the 20th century with writers such as Lucien Febvre and Peter Gay, an expanding range of methodological approaches is being applied.

Scope
In the last decade, the history of emotions has developed into an increasing productive and intellectually stimulating area of historical research. Although there are precursors of the history of emotions - especially Febvre's Histoire des Sensibilités or Gay's Psychohistory  - the field converges methodologically with newer historiographical approaches such as conceptual history, historical constructivism and the history of the body.

Similar to the sociology of emotions or anthropology of emotions, the history of emotions is based on the assumption that not only the expression of feelings, but also the feelings themselves are learned. Culture and history are changing and so are feelings as well as their expression. The social relevance and potency of emotions is historically and culturally variable. In the view of many historians, emotion is, therefore, just as fundamental a category of history, as class, race or gender.

Methodology
A number of different methodological approaches have been discussed in recent years. Some historians of the emotions limit their research to the historical analysis of emotional norms and rules under the heading of emotionology. Particularly in the recent past, however, the methodological spectrum of the history of emotions has expanded to include performative, constructivist and practice theory approaches. Currently fundamental methodological concepts include: emotives, emotional habitus and emotional practice.  Additionally there are several terms that describe the different scope and binding effect of feeling cultures such as emotional community, emotional regime, and emotional style. More recently, the history of emotions has engaged with recent social and cultural turns in the neurosciences, positing the history of emotions as a component part of a broader biocultural historicism.

Bibliography

Introductions
 Rob Boddice, The History of Emotions, Manchester: Manchester University Press, 2018.
 Jan Plamper, Geschichte und Gefühl. Grundlagen der Emotionsgeschichte, Munich: Siedler 2012.
 Barbara Rosenwein and Riccardo Cristiani, What is the History of Emotions? Cambridge: Polity, 2018.

Literature
 Rob Boddice, The History of Emotions: Past, Present, Future, in: Revista de Estudios Sociales, 62 (2017), pp. 10–15.
 Rob Boddice, The History of Emotions, in: New Directions in Social and Cultural History, ed. Sasha Handley, Rohan McWilliam, Lucy Noakes, London: Bloomsbury, 2018.
 Susan J. Matt, Current Emotion Research in History: Or, Doing History from the Inside Out, in: Emotion Review 3, 1 (2011), p. 117–124.
 Bettina Hitzer, Emotionsgeschichte - ein Anfang mit Folgen. Forschungsbericht.
 Anna Wierzbicka, The “History of Emotions” and the Future of Emotion Research, in: Emotion Review 2, 3 (2010), p. 269-273.
 Barbara Rosenwein, Problems and Methods in the History of Emotions.
 William M. Reddy, Historical Research on the Self and Emotions, in : Emotion Review 1, 4 (2009), p. 302-315.
 Florian Weber, Von der klassischen Affektenlehre zur Neurowissenschaft und zurück. Wege der Emotionsforschung in den Geistes- und Sozialwissenschaften, in: Neue Politische Literatur 53 (2008), p. 21-42.
 Daniela Saxer, Mit Gefühl handeln. Ansätze der Emotionsgeschichte.
 Alexandra Przyrembel, Sehnsucht nach Gefühlen. Zur Konjunktur der Emotionen in der Geschichtswissenschaft, in: L’homme 16 (2005), p. 116-124.
 Rüdiger Schnell, Historische Emotionsforschung. Eine mediävistische Standortbestimmung, in: Frühmittelalterliche Studien 38 (2004), p. 173-276.

Methodological discussions
AHR Conversation: The Historical Study of Emotions.
Frank Biess, Discussion Forum „History of Emotions“ (with Alon Confino, Ute Frevert, Uffa Jensen, Lyndal Roper, Daniela Saxer), in: German History 28 (2010), H. 1, p. 67-80.
Maren Lorenz: Tiefe Wunden. Gewalterfahrung in den Kriegen der Frühen Neuzeit, in: Ulrich Bielefeld/Heinz Bude/Bernd Greiner (Hg.): Gesellschaft - Gewalt – Vertrauen. Jan Philipp Reemtsma zum 60. Geburtstag, Hamburger Edition: Hamburg 2012, S. 332–354.
Jan Plamper, The History of Emotions: An Interview with William Reddy, Barbara Rosenwein, and Peter Stearns, in: History and Theory 49, no. 2 (2010): 237–265.

Research centres and organizations
ACCESS The Amsterdam Centre for Cross-disciplinary Emotion and Sensory Studies
ARC Centre of Excellence for the History of Emotions (1100-1800)
Center for the History of Emotions, Max Planck-Institute for Human Development, Berlin
 NACHE The North American Chapter on the History of Emotion
Queen Mary Centre for the History of Emotions, London
Les Émotions au Moyen Age (EMMA)
CHEP: An International Network for the Cultural History of Emotions in Premodernity
The Emotions Project: The Social and Cultural Construction of Emotions: The Greek Paradigm, Oxford
Historia cultural del concimiento. Discursos, prácticas, representaciones, Centro de Ciencias humanas y sociales, Madrid
Cluster of Excellence "Languages of Emotion", FU Berlin

References

External links
History of Emotions Blog, Queen Mary Centre for the History of Emotions
CHE Histories of Emotions Blog, ARC Centre of Excellence for the History of Emotions (Europe 1100-1800)
Sociology of Emotions
History of Emotions data base run by the ARC Centre of Excellence for the History of Emotions (Europe 1100-1800)
"History of Emotions - Insights into Research" website with short articles on methods of the History of Emotions, run by the Center for the History of Emotions, Max Planck Institute for Human Development, Berlin (Germany)

Emotion